OpenRCT2 is a construction and management simulation video game that simulates amusement park management. It is a free and open-source re-implementation and expansion of the 2002 video game RollerCoaster Tycoon 2. In order to create an accurate clone of RollerCoaster Tycoon 2, the game was incrementally written in the platform independent C programming language. In addition to various gameplay changes, the developers fixed a number of bugs and issues that were in the original game.

Gameplay

The gameplay of OpenRCT2 is, by nature of the project, very similar to the original RollerCoaster Tycoon 2 game upon which it is based. However, the re-implementation features a number of changes:
Fast-forward mode
Multiplayer support
Support for high-definition resolutions.
Support for content from the original RollerCoaster Tycoon, such as scenarios.
Increased previous software limits on parks, such as scenery availability.
Options to exceed or tweak restrictions such as height clearance.
Optional early victory conditions, should goals be met before time runs out.
Improvements to pathfinding AI
Cheats

Development 
Development of the game was started on April 2, 2014, by Ted "IntelOrca" John, and was continued by 250 other contributors.

In 2019, the game was brought to custom firmware Nintendo Switch systems by modder rsn8887 as a homebrew game, including touchscreen support.

A major update in 2022 allowed the game to use RollerCoaster Tycoon Classic (an official port of the original games) as a base install path.

Reception
PC Gamer praised the increased scope for creativity with the new toolset, adding: "you can build the park of your dreams with coasters that no sane person who values their intestines would think about riding. It’s a great way to return to such a wonderful classic PC game." Vice noted that OpenRCT2 "allows players much greater freedom in what they are able to build." Kotaku Australia pointed out that OpenRCT2 allows RollerCoaster Tycoon 2 to run on modern systems "just fine", and features multiplayer support, weakening the incentive to purchase the later released RollerCoaster Tycoon Classic.

In 2020, Nerdist suggested OpenRCT2 among other stress-relieving games to play during the COVID-19 pandemic.

See also
 OpenTTD
 List of open-source video games

References

External links
 

RollerCoaster Tycoon
2014 video games
Business simulation games
Cooperative video games
Fangames
Free software programmed in C++
Free software that uses SDL
Linux games
MacOS games
Multiplayer and single-player video games
Multiplayer online games
Open-source video games
Video games with isometric graphics
Video games with tile-based graphics
Video game remaster mods
Windows games